Taothingmang was a Meetei ruler of Ningthouja dynasty of Ancient Manipur (Antique Kangleipak). He is a son and the successor of Emperor Khuyoi Tompok.
He is one of the nine kings associated with the different designs in a historic flag of the kingdom. Other than the Cheitharol Kumbaba, the Ningthourol Lambuba and the Chada Laihui, Taothingmang and his elder brother Yoimongba are also especially mentioned in the Toreirol Lambuba and the Tutenglon.

Other Books

References 

Kings of Ancient Manipur
History of Manipur
Pages with unreviewed translations